Perryus is a genus of phacopid trilobites that lived in what are now Canada, Greenland, and Siberia from the early Silurian to the middle Silurian from 438 to 430 mya, existing for approximately .

Taxonomy 
Perryus was named by Gass & Mikulic in 1982. Jell and Adrain list it as a currently valid genus name within the Phacopida, specifically within the Encrinuridae.

Species included
Perryus bartletti Edgecombe & Chatterton, 1992; Perryus globosus (Maksimova, 1962); Perryus mikulici Hughes & Thomas, 2014; Perryus severnensis Gass & Mikulic, 1982 (type species); Perryus palasso (Lane, 1988)

References 

Encrinuridae genera
Silurian trilobites of North America
 Paleozoic life of Ontario
Silurian trilobites of Asia
Fossil taxa described in 1982